Vazisubani may refer to:

 Vazisubani, Gurjaani, a village in Gurjaani municipality, Georgia
 Vazisubani, Samtredia, a village in Samtredia municipality, Georgia
 Vazisubani, Tbilisi, a neighborhood in Tbilisi, Georgia
 Vazisubani (wine), a Georgian wine